Jamie Lorenza Holland (born February 1, 1964) is a former professional American football wide receiver in the National Football League. He played six seasons for the San Diego Chargers (1987–1989), the Los Angeles Raiders (1990–1991), and the Cleveland Browns (1992).

In 2010, he became a volunteer coach for the Capital City Steelers, a Pop Warner youth football and cheer organization in Raleigh, NC. He has also served as a teacher and a wide receiver coach for Wake Forest High School.

References

1964 births
Living people
Players of American football from Raleigh, North Carolina
American football wide receivers
Butler Grizzlies football players
Ohio State Buckeyes football players
San Diego Chargers players
Los Angeles Raiders players
Cleveland Browns players